Infinite Granite is the fifth studio album by American band Deafheaven, released on August 20, 2021, through Sargent House. The album represents a dramatic departure from the black metal influences of the band's previous albums, and a shift toward a shoegaze style with mostly clean vocals from frontman George Clarke.

Recording
The album was produced by Justin Meldal-Johnsen, and was recorded with longtime Deafheaven producer and engineer Jack Shirley primarily at his Atomic Garden East studio in Oakland, California.

Release
On June 9, 2021, Deafheaven announced Infinite Granite, simultaneously releasing its lead single, "Great Mass of Color". A second single, "The Gnashing", was released on July 8, 2021. A third and final single, "In Blur", was released on August 4, 2021. Infinite Granite was released by Sargent House on August 20, 2021.

Critical reception

At Metacritic, which assigns a normalized rating out of 100 to reviews from mainstream publications, Infinite Granite received an average score of 82 based on 21 reviews, indicating "universal acclaim".

In a perfect 5/5 star review, Michael Hann of The Guardian called Infinite Granite a "great, great album, one that exists entirely on its creators' terms." Hann also praised drummer Daniel Tracy, writing, "he is what gives this record its power – his fills and patterns give Infinite Granite attack that never wavers, even when the music is at its most melodic." In a 9/10 review, Marie Oleinik of The Line of Best Fit felt the album "reinstates that less is, in fact, more." Jem Aswad of Variety wrote that the band "continues their progression as one of the most innovative and powerful rock acts of the past 20 years." Elizabeth Aubrey of NME called it the band's "most ambitious and cohesive album to date and embracing their shoegaze selves brings renewal: for a band known for torment and chaos, it's a joy to hear them sounding so hopeful." Chris Bryson of Exclaim! wrote, "In its lyrics and tone, Infinite Granite is remarkably blue, and beautifully so. Some fans might not appreciate the direction the band has taken towards the light, but nevertheless, the heart of Deafheaven remains."

In a less favorable review, David Weaver of Clash wrote, "There are some real moments of beauty on the record - 'In Blur' aches and sparkles, whilst singles 'Great Mass Of Colour' and 'The Gnashing' showcase a band adept at building beautiful soundscapes even with the guitars turned down - but at a certain point, the album suffers from the lack of depth in Clarke's vocals, or range in his melodies." A.A. Dowd of The A.V. Club agreed, writing, "Here, we get only the beauty: a long, indistinguishable blur of pleasure." Christina Wenig of Metal Hammer praised the album's songwriting and production and the band for attempting to change their sound, but ultimately felt that "somewhere along the way, Deafheaven have lost some of the intensity that had previously made them irresistible."

Accolades

Track listing

Personnel
Credits adapted from the liner notes of Infinite Granite.

Deafheaven
 George Clarke – vocals (tracks 1–3, 5–9)
 Kerry McCoy – guitars (tracks 1–3, 5–9), vocals (tracks 1, 9), synthesizers (tracks 4, 5, 8)
 Shiv Mehra – guitars, synthesizers (all tracks); vocals (tracks 1–3, 5–7, 9), acoustic guitar (track 9)
 Chris Johnson – bass guitar (tracks 1–3, 5–9), vocals (tracks 1–3, 5–7, 9)
 Daniel Tracy – drums, percussion (tracks 1–3, 5–9); vocals (tracks 1, 2)

Additional personnel
 Justin Meldal-Johnsen – production, engineering, Fender Bass VI (track 2), additional vocals (tracks 3, 8, 9), additional synthesizers (tracks 4, 6, 8), additional guitar (track 9)
 Chelsea Jade – additional vocals (tracks 3, 9)
 Jack Shirley – engineering
 Darrell Thorp – mixing, engineering
 Brendan Dekora – engineering
 Chris Johnson – engineering
 Joshua Lago – assistant engineering
 Dave Cooley – mastering
 Nick Steinhardt, 23in – art direction and design

Charts

References

2021 albums
Deafheaven albums
Albums produced by Justin Meldal-Johnsen
Sargent House albums